Kyburz may refer to:

Kyburz, California, small town in El Dorado County, California
Kyburz Switzerland, a Swiss manufacturer of small electro vehicles

People
Albert Kyburz, American postman
Ernst Kyburz, Swiss wrestler
Hanspeter Kyburz, Swiss composer
Matthias Kyburz, Swiss orienteer
Rosemary Kyburz, Australian politician